The atrioventricular nodal branch is a coronary artery that supplies arterial blood to the atrioventricular node, which is responsible for initiating muscular contraction of the ventricles. The AV nodal branch is most often a branch of the right coronary artery.

Structure

Origin 
The atrioventricular nodal branch sees significant variation in origin:

 proximal posterolateral branch from the right coronary artery in around 77%.
 distal posterolateral branch from the right coronary artery in around 2%.
 distal right coronary artery in around 10%.
 right posterior interventricular artery in around 7%.
 distal circumflex branch of left coronary artery in around 4%.

The right coronary artery supplies the atrioventricular node in around 90% of people.

In approximately 2% of people, the vascular supply to the atrioventricular node arises from both the right coronary artery and the left circumflex branch.

Function 
The atrioventricular nodal branch supplies the atrioventricular node, allowing for excitation of the ventricles.

See also
 Coronary circulation

References

Arteries of the thorax